A European Capital of Culture is a city designated by the European Union (EU) for a period of one calendar year during which it organises a series of cultural events with a strong pan-European dimension. Being a European Capital of Culture can be an opportunity for a city to generate considerable cultural, social and economic benefits and it can help foster urban regeneration, change the city's image and raise its visibility and profile on an international scale. Multiple cities can be a European Capital of Culture simultaneously.

In 1985, Melina Mercouri, Greece’s Minister of Culture, and her French counterpart Jack Lang came up with the idea of designating an annual City of Culture to bring Europeans closer together by highlighting the richness and diversity of European cultures and raising awareness of their common history and values.

The Commission of the European Union manages the title and each year the Council of Ministers of the European Union formally designates European Capitals of Culture: more than 40 cities have been designated so far. The current European Capitals of Culture for 2023 are Eleusis in Greece, Timișoara in Romania and Veszprém in Hungary.

Selection process 

An international panel of cultural experts is in charge of assessing the proposals of cities for the title according to criteria specified by the European Union.

For two of the capitals each year, eligibility is open to cities in EU member states only. From 2021 and every three years thereafter, a third capital will be chosen from cities in countries that are candidates or potential candidates for membership, or in countries that are part of the European Economic Area (EEA)– an example of the latter being Stavanger, Norway, which was a European Capital of Culture in 2008.

A 2004 study conducted for the Commission, known as the "Palmer report", demonstrated that the choice of European Capital of Culture served as a catalyst for cultural development and the transformation of the city. Consequently, the beneficial socio-economic development and impact for the chosen city are now also considered in determining the chosen cities.

Bids from five United Kingdom cities to be the 2023 Capital of Culture were disqualified in November 2017, because the UK was planning to leave the EU before 2023.

History 
The European Capital of Culture programme was initially called the European City of Culture and was conceived in 1983, by Melina Mercouri, then serving as minister of culture in Greece. Mercouri believed that at the time, culture was not given the same attention as politics and economics and a project for promoting European cultures within the member states should be pursued. The European City of Culture programme was launched in the summer of 1985 with Athens being the first title-holder. In 1999, the European City of Culture program was renamed to European Capital of Culture.

List of European Capitals of Culture 

1 The European Capital of Culture was due to be in the UK in 2023. However, due to its decision to leave the European Union, UK cities would no longer be eligible to hold the title after 2019. The European Commission's Scotland office confirmed that this would be the case on 23 November 2017, only one week before the UK was due to announce which city would be put forward. The candidate cities were Dundee, Leeds, Milton Keynes, Nottingham and a joint bid from Northern Irish cities Belfast, Derry and Strabane.

2 A new framework makes it possible for cities in candidate countries (Albania, Montenegro, North Macedonia, Serbia, Turkey), potential candidates for EU membership (Bosnia and Herzegovina, Kosovo) or EFTA member states (Iceland, Liechtenstein, Norway, Switzerland) to hold the title every third year as of 2021. This will be selected through an open competition, meaning that cities from various countries may compete with each other.

See also

References

External links

 European Capitals of Culture
 Decision No 1622/2006/EC of the European Parliament and of the Council of 24 October 2006 establishing a Community action for the European Capital of Culture event for the years 2007 to 2019
 Decision No 445/2014/EU of the European Parliament and of the Council of 16 April 2014 establishing a Union action for the European Capitals of Culture for the years 2020 to 2033 and repealing Decision No 1622/2006/EC

Cultural policies of the European Union
Lists of cities in Europe
 
Lists of capitals